was a town located in Nakagami District, Okinawa Prefecture, Japan.

As of 2003, the town had an estimated population of 13,177 and the density of 691.71 persons per km2. The total area was 19.05 km2.

On April 1, 2005, Yonashiro, along with the cities of Gushikawa and Ishikawa, and the town of Katsuren (also from Nakagami District), was merged to create the city of Uruma.

It was elevated to town status and renamed to Yonashiro in 1994.

References

External links
Town of Yonashiro website (archives)
Uruma official website

Dissolved municipalities of Okinawa Prefecture